Sanjay Thumma (born 26 April 1970) popularly known as Vah-Chef, is an Indian celebrity chef, entrepreneur, restaurateur and television personality. He is the founder of the cooking website, vahrehvah.com. He is especially popular among the Indie-expatriate communities in mainland India. He became known for his online recipe channel on YouTube, which he started in 2007, with over 750 million views. He is one of the three judges in the first season of MasterChef India – Telugu.

Early life 
Sanjay Thumma was born in Hyderabad. His interest in the kitchen began when he was just 7 years old. His mother would engage him in the kitchen so that he would not annoy his siblings. His first dishes were dosa and scrambled eggs. His desire to cook increased when his mother was bedridden with a temporary illness and he had to cook for himself. He eventually went on to get his diploma in Hotel Management from IHM Hyderabad. He is married to Ragini, who is also a chef, with whom he has a son.

Career 
Thumma opened his first restaurant, Sizzle India, in Chicago in 1998. Over the next seven years, he  opened three more. He eventually sold his restaurants as he felt that as a chef he hardly got a chance to cook.

In September 2007, he set up a studio in Chicago and started recording his first 150 recipes, which he posted on YouTube on his channel VahChef, soon becoming a sensation, and  each video reaching over a million views. His channel went on to become viral and gained a large following among Indian communities all over the world. His channel  crossed 750 million views with 2.3 million subscribers and more than 2,000 videos. He adds 10 to 12 new videos each month, with thousands of views within hours. 

He moved back to India in 2008 with his family and launched his own website, vahrehvah.com. In 2014, his channel had 1.45 million subscribers. As of June 2021, his YouTube channel has 2.39 million subscribers.

Television

Awards 

 2018 – OSM Foodie/Chef of the Year at Outlook Social Media Awards

References

External links
 Official website

1970 births
Indian chefs
Living people
Chefs of Indian cuisine
Businesspeople from Hyderabad, India
Indian television personalities